Håkan Söderstjerna (born 30 October 1975) is a Swedish former professional footballer who played as a midfielder. In media he sometimes went under the alias "The one armed bandit", as he was born with one arm only.

Career
Söderstjerna, who was born without his lower right arm, played club football in Sweden, Denmark, Singapore and Norway for Landskrona BoIS (three spells), Fremad Amager (two spells), Tanjong Pagar United FC and Fredrikstad. He retired from club football in November 2007. Fans of Landskrona BoIS had previously written a song in his honour. Söderstjerna also studied economics and law at Lund University.

References

1975 births
Living people
Swedish footballers
Association football midfielders
Landskrona BoIS players
Fremad Amager players
Tanjong Pagar United FC players
Fredrikstad FK players
Swedish expatriate footballers
Expatriate men's footballers in Denmark
Swedish expatriate sportspeople in Denmark
Expatriate footballers in Singapore
Swedish expatriate sportspeople in Singapore
Expatriate footballers in Norway
Swedish expatriate sportspeople in Norway